Chumakovsky is a rural locality (a khutor) in Vishnyakovskoye Rural Settlement, Uryupinsky District, Volgograd Oblast, Russia. The population was 59 as of 2010. There are 2 streets.

Geography 
Chumakovsky is located 29 km northeast of Uryupinsk (the district's administrative centre) by road. Vishnyakovsky is the nearest rural locality.

References 

Rural localities in Uryupinsky District